Indian Lake is a lake in Cass County in southwestern Michigan in the United States. It is a spring-fed lake. The lake was named for Indians who once settled there.

There are approximately 220 homes on the lake, of which a third are on leased land. 
On the west side is Indian Lake Hills Golf Course, with 3 nine-hole courses: East, West and North.

On the east end there is Indian Yacht Club, with a well-maintained boat ramp. Membership is required to use the ramp.

See also
List of lakes in Michigan

References

Bodies of water of Cass County, Michigan
Lakes of Michigan